The 2023 Super GT Series is a motor racing championship based in Japan for grand touring cars. The series is sanctioned by the Japan Automobile Federation (JAF) and run by the GT Association (GTA). It is the thirty-first season of the JAF Super GT Championship, which includes the All Japan Grand Touring Car Championship era, and the nineteenth season under the Super GT name. It is also the forty-first overall season of a national JAF sportscar championship dating back to the All Japan Endurance/Sports Prototype Championship.

Team Impul and drivers Kazuki Hiramine and Bertrand Baguette will enter the season as the defending GT500 champions, while Kondo Racing and driver João Paulo de Oliveira will enter the season as the defending GT300 champions.

Regulation changes 
GTA chairman Masaaki Bandoh outlined the series' environmental initiative plans in November 2022, known as the "Super GT Green Project 2030". The series aims to reduce carbon emissions by 50 percent by 2030. As part of this initiative, Super GT have made the following regulation changes for 2023:

 Super GT will debut a new, 100 percent sustainable carbon-neutral fuel manufactured by ETS Racing Fuels, a division of Haltermann Carless GmbH. The new ETS Renewablaze GTA R100 racing fuel will be used by all teams beginning this season.
 The number of tyre sets available to teams per race weekend has been limited to five sets of dry tyres and six sets of wet tyres for 300 kilometre race meetings, one set fewer for each than in 2022. The number of tyre sets available for 450km races will be determined on a case-by-case basis.

Teams and drivers
On 20 February, 2023, the GTA released the series entry list, featuring 15 entries in the GT500 class and 27 entries in the GT300 class. All teams will compete under a Japanese license.

GT500

GT300

Vehicle changes

GT500 

 Honda announced that a new GT500 car based on the Civic Type R will debut in 2024. As a result, 2023 will be the final season for the second-generation NSX-GT.

GT300 
 apr replaced their Toyota GR Sport Prius PHV with a new hybrid GT300 car, the Lexus LC500h GT. The Prius had served as apr's flagship car since 2012.
 After selling their Toyota 86 Mother Chassis to Team Mach in the off-season, Anest Iwata Racing with Arnage (see Entrant changes below) changed to the Lexus RC F GT3.
 Pacific Racing Team have replaced their Ferrari 488 GT3 Evo with a Mercedes-AMG GT3 Evo.

Entrant changes

GT500 
 Toyota: Toyota Gazoo Racing announced their GT500 class driver line-ups on 25 November 2022. Sacha Fenestraz, who raced with TOM'S, left the series to compete in Formula E with Nissan. Ritomo Miyata and Giuliano Alesi will exchange cars, with Miyata going to the number 36 team and Alesi going to the number 37 with new sponsorship from Deloitte, alongside Ukyo Sasahara, who officially joined Toyota on 12 January 2023 after leaving Honda.
 Honda: Honda Racing announced their GT500 class driver line-ups on 12 December 2022. Mugen (M-TEC) will work together with ARTA and compete with two cars entered under the ARTA name. Toshiki Oyu will move from the number 16 car (entered as Team Red Bull Mugen in 2022) to the number 8 ARTA car to partner Tomoki Nojiri. In exchange, Nirei Fukuzumi will move to the number 16 car to partner Hiroki Otsu, who joins ARTA after three seasons at Nakajima Racing. Kakunoshin Ohta will step up from GT300 to take Otsu's place at Nakajima Racing, alongside Takuya Izawa.
 Nissan: Nissan announced their GT500 class driver line-ups on 27 January 2023. There were no changes in teams and drivers from the 2022 season. Team Impul will carry the GT500 champions number 1 plate, while Kazuki Hoshino was appointed Team Principal alongside his father, Kazuyoshi Hoshino, who continues as Team Director. Team Impul's title sponsor, Marelli, retired the Calsonic brand and the car will now be entered as the "Marelli Impul Z". NDDP Racing signed Niterra (formerly NGK) as their new title sponsor, replacing specialty dealer CraftSports.

GT300 
 Team UpGarage recruited 2022 F4 Japanese Champion Syun Koide to replace Kakunoshin Ohta, following his promotion to the GT500 class.
 After forming a two-car GT500 programme with M-TEC, ARTA will not enter the GT300 class in 2023.
 2016 GT300 champion Takamitsu Matsui transferred from Hoppy Team Tsuchiya to Team Mach, replacing Reiji Hiraki. Matsui will be replaced by former LEON Racing driver Togo Suganami, who returned to the series full-time in 2023.
 Reigning Super Formula Lights champion Kazuto Kotaka replaced Yuhki Nakayama in the number 31 apr team, with Yuki Nemoto signed as the third driver for long-distance rounds. Yuta Kamimura and reigning Porsche Carrera Cup Japan champion Ryo Ogawa will share the role of third driver in the number 30 apr GR86 GT. 
 2012 DTM champion and BMW factory driver Bruno Spengler will make his series debut with BMW Team Studie, partnering the returning Seiji Ara. Two-time GT500 and GT300 champion Masataka Yanagida will be the team's third driver and will replace Spengler in the event of calendar clashes. The entrant name was changed from BMW Team Studie x CSL (Customer Racing Support Limited) to BMW Team Studie x CRS (Customer Racing Support). 
 2008 GT300 champion Hironobu Yasuda moved to the number 10 GAINER team to partner second-year driver Riki Okusa. Video game developer PONOS became the new title sponsor of the number 10 car. In exchange, Ryuichiro Tomita moved to the number 11 car to partner Keishi Ishikawa. Yusuke Shiotsu, previously the third driver of the number 10 car, will now be the third driver of the number 11 car for long-distance rounds.
 Anest Iwata Racing will make their debut in Super GT, working together with Arnage Racing as Anest Iwata Racing with Arnage. Igor Fraga, a multi-time Gran Turismo World Series champion and former FIA Formula 3 Championship driver, will race alongside 2021 Formula Regional Japanese Champion Yuga Furutani for the full season. 2022 Formula Regional Japanese Champion Miki Koyama will be the team's third driver, the first woman to race in the series since Cyndie Allemann in 2012. All three drivers will make their series debut.
 Yogibo Racing returned to Super GT as an independent team, having previously competed in a collaboration with Drago Corse in the 2021 season. The team will field a Honda NSX GT3 and receive technical support from Servus Japan, who previously supported ARTA. F4 Japanese Championship graduates Reimei Ito and Yugo Iwasawa will race full-time, making their series debut.
2020 FIA F4 Japanese Champion Hibiki Taira will run his first full season in the series, joining Yuui Tsutsumi at muta Racing INGING. Two-time GT300 championship runner-up Hiroki Katoh was appointed as the new team director and will shift to a part-time driving role as the team's third driver.
 2021 Super Formula Lights champion Teppei Natori will return to the series with defending series champions Kondo Racing, replacing two-time and reigning GT300 champion Kiyoto Fujinami. Kondo Racing declined the option to use the number 0 plate reserved for the reigning GT300 series champions and will keep the number 56.
Drago Corse, who dropped out of the 2022 season due to sponsorship issues, will not return to the series in 2023.
 Pacific Racing Team ended their collaboration with CarGuy Racing and Hololive Production after the 2022 season. Instead, they have entered a new collaboration with virtual YouTuber agency Vspo! and signed an all-new driver line up of Ryohei Sakaguchi, Alex Jiatong Liang, and Shintaro Kawabata.

Calendar
A confirmed eight round provisional 2023 calendar was announced on 8 August 2022. On 28 December 2022, the dates of Sugo and Autopolis rounds were changed. On 20 February 2023, distances and formats for all rounds were confirmed. The spring race at Suzuka Circuit and the penultimate round in Autopolis will be 450 kilometre semi-endurance races with two compulsory pit stops for refuelling. Also, the first and final rounds of the championship will no longer require teams to change tyres on their compulsory pit stops.

NOTE: Race names are preliminary and subject to change.

Notes

References

External links 
 Super GT Official Website

Super GT seasons
Super GT
Super GT